Peter Ashworth is an English photographer. Ashworth initially specialized in music photography, between 1979 and 2000. In the 1980s, he worked with many UK artists including The Smiths, Depeche Mode, Eurythmics, Soft Cell, Jimmy Page and The Associates.

He has also performed as a musician with various bands, including Marc and the Mambas (with Marc Almond), The Gadgets, and The The. In 1980, Ashworth—using his Triash pseudonym—was briefly a member of the band The The with Matt Johnson. In 1982–1983, he played drums as a member of Marc and the Mambas.

He now works predominantly in fashion and style/culture photography, working with fashion designers such as Stephen Jones, Basso & Brooke and Atsuko Kudo. He is known in part for his photography of fetish subjects, for creating sets and shooting on location using lighting techniques that explore the textures and cut of his subjects.

Ashworth's work is featured in The National Portrait Gallery permanent collection archive, consisting of twelve images: Adam and the Ants - Kings Of The Wild Frontier; Annie Lennox - Eurythmics: Touch & Face to Face portrait; Frankie Goes To Hollywood - Welcome To The Pleasuredome; Soft Cell - Bedsitter & Non-Stop Erotic Cabaret; Associates - Sulk; Erasure - phone-booth; David Sylvian - portrait; Julian Cope - Saint Julian (album); Visage - debut sleeve; Steve Strange - portrait.

Photography

Music
Ashworth's work came to prominence in the 1980s when he worked with pop bands such as Soft Cell, Eurythmics and The Associates; rock artists such as The Clash, The Ramones, The Cult, Tina Turner, Julian Cope and The The; post-punk band PIL with John Lydon; 1980s-era New Romantic performers Visage and Steve Strange; and established artists such as Bryan Ferry.

Ashworth's images have been used on album and single covers of the artists he has photographed, including Adam & The Ants’ Kings of the Wild Frontier, The Associates’ Sulk, Soft Cell's Non-Stop Erotic Cabaret, Frankie Goes to Hollywood's Welcome to the Pleasuredome,  Visage's debut album Visage  and Eurythmics' Touch.

Unusually for a rock photographer, Ashworth worked mostly with the large, square format Hasselblad cameras because, as he reasoned, ‘album covers are square’.

Fashion
Through his initial work with musicians and designers in the eighties, Ashworth came into contact with fashion designers and moved into the area of fashion photography, working with designers such as British milliner Stephen Jones OBE, (both Ashworth and Jones working together with Visage and Steve Strange)) - Jones using Ashworth's portrait on his first business card in 1979.

Ashworth has also worked and with British fetish designers Murray & Vern, Basso & Brooke, and Atsuko Kudo.

Ashworth's photographic work with the avant-garde performance artist and fashion model Leigh Bowery was featured in a 2012 celebration of Bowery's life entitled Xtravaganza: Staging Leigh Bowery that was held at the Kunsthalle Wien museum in Vienna, Austria.

Musician
In 1980, Ashworth - using the pseudonym Triash - as briefly a member of the band The The with Matt Johnson, appearing on the single "Controversial Subject" as drummer and vocalist. In 1982–1983, he played drums as a member of Marc and the Mambas, appearing on their debut album Untitled and photographing the album's cover; and again as band percussionist and album photographer for their follow-up album, Torment and Toreros

Ashworth was also drummer in The The's Matt Johnson’s side project The Gadgets, who produced one album in 1983, The Blue Album.

Other
The ubiquity of Ashworth’s photographic work with music artists in the eighties led to him being mentioned in Mari Wilson’s UK Top 10 hit song ‘Just What I Always Wanted’
 (The lyrics also namecheck the song's writer, Teddy Johns, though 'Teddy' is often misheard as 'Tenney')

“I've got a mink from Paris, a ring from Rome
A whole new wardrobe in my home
A tune from Teddy, an Ashworth snap
These are the landmarks on my map
I've got just what I always wanted”

Exhibitions

Solo
 Mavericks - Lever Gallery, London, 2018.
Mavericks Photographic Show - The Gallery, Liverpool, 2018

Contributor
 Street Style: From Sidewalk to Catwalk - V&A, London 
 Hats: An Anthology by Stephen Jones -  V&A, London
 The House of Annie Lennox - V&A, London
 Otherness - Louis Vuitton Gallery, Paris

Books
Contributor
  Fetish: Masterpieces of Erotic Fantasy Photography by Michelle Olley

Selected album, EP and single cover photography

Tar (Visage's first single, 1979)
Kings of the Wild Frontier (Adam and the Ants, 1980)
Visage (Visage, 1980)
Non-Stop Erotic Cabaret (Soft Cell, 1981)
Bedsitter (song) single (Soft Cell, 1981)
In the Garden (Eurythmics, 1981)
Careless Memories (Duran Duran's second single, 1981)
Sticky George (The Korgies, 1981)
Uncertain Smile single (The The, 1982)
Touch (Eurythmics, 1983)
You Are in My System (Robert Palmer, 1983)
Making History (Linton Kwesi Johnson, 1983)
Doppelganger (Kid Creole and the Coconuts, 1983)
Welcome To The Pleasuredome, (Frankie Goes To Hollywood, 1984)
Vermin in Ermine (Marc Almond, 1984)
Bananarama (Bananarama, 1984)
Doctor! Doctor! (Thompson Twins, 1984)

Private Dancer (Tina Turner, 1984)
Sophisticated Boom Boom (Dead Or Alive, 1984)
Addicted to Love (Robert Palmer, 1986)
The Foolish Thing to Do (Heaven 17, 1986)
Saint Julian (Julian Cope, 1987)
Holy Water (The Triffids song) (The Triffids, 1987)
Outrider (Jimmy Page, 1988)
Malafemmina (Gianna Nannini, 1988)
Different (Thomas Anders, 1989)
And Now the Legacy Begins (Dream Warriors, 1991)
Devil Hopping (Inspiral Carpets, 1994)
Das Ist Ein Groovy Beat, Ja (Jake Slazenger, 1996)
Hearts and Knives (Visage, 2013)
Late Night Tales: Röyksopp (various artists, 2013)

References

External links
 Peter Ashworth 
 Peter Ashworth : Mavericks 
 The Guardian illustrated interview 

Year of birth missing (living people)
Living people
English rock drummers
English photographers
The The members
Marc and the Mambas members